Amy Schwartz Moretti (born 1975) is an American violinist, currently the Caroline Paul King Chair in Strings at Mercer University's Townsend School of Music.

Moretti was born in Wisconsin and raised in North Carolina and California. She studied in the pre-college program at the San Francisco Conservatory of Music, who awarded her their Distinguished Alumni Award in 2014, and earned bachelor's and master's degrees from the Cleveland Institute of Music, who awarded her an Alumni Achievement Award in 2005. She has been concertmaster at The Florida Orchestra and the Oregon Symphony and in 2007 became the first director of the Robert McDuffie Center for Strings at the Townsend School of Music.

References

External links
Official website

1975 births
Living people
Mercer University faculty
21st-century American women musicians
21st-century American violinists
Women violinists
Cleveland Institute of Music alumni
Concertmasters
San Francisco Conservatory of Music alumni
American women academics